Mulvihill is a surname. Its Irish form is Ó Maolmhichíl or Ó Maoilmhichil. The motto of the clan is "Pro Aris et Focis, which translates as "For Hearth and Home".

People 
Daráine Mulvihill/Ní Mhaolmhichil, Irish Person of the Year 2001.
John Mulvihill (politician), Irish Labour Party politician.
Liam Mulvihill, 17th Director General of the Gaelic Athletic Association.
Margaret Mulvihill (1954–), Irish writer
Patricia Mulvihill, colorist who has worked in the comics industry.
Sarah-Jayne Mulvihill, Flight Lieutenant in the Royal Air Force who died in Iraq.

See also 
Ó Maoilmhichil
Mitchell (disambiguation)
Surnames